Mohamad Kaharuddin bin Abdul Rahman (born 7 August 1991) is a Malaysian footballer who is now a goalkeeper for SAINS.

Club Career 
Kaharuddin started his career in football from 2010 where he played with the Negeri Sembilan President's Cup squad in 2009. He was then promoted to the Negeri Sembilan main squad in 2010 and remains loyal to the Negeri Sembilan team until now (2023). Born in Seremban, Negeri Sembilan, he revealed that he had been offered to play for several other teams but turned it down because he preferred to represent his home state. He has been with the team for 15 years since 2009 and he is still loyal until now because he does not feel comfortable wearing the jersey of another team other than Negeri Sembilan, he said. Has made 22 appearances during his time with Negeri Sembilan and has played an important role during his time in Negeri Sembilan.

References

External links
 
 Profile at Stadium Astro

Living people
Malaysian people of Malay descent
Malaysian footballers
Negeri Sembilan FA players
1991 births
People from Negeri Sembilan
Negeri Sembilan FC players
Association football goalkeepers